Deux-Jumeaux is a commune in the Calvados department in the Normandy region in northwestern France.

History

World War II
After the liberation of the area by Allied Forces in early June 1944, engineers of the Ninth Air Force IX Engineering Command began construction of a combat Advanced Landing Ground to the northeast of the town.  Declared operational on 30 June, the airfield was designated as "A-4", it was used by the 48th Fighter Group which flew P-47 Thunderbolts until the end of August when the unit moved into Central France.  Afterward, the airfield was closed.

Population

See also
Communes of the Calvados department

References

Communes of Calvados (department)